The Foreshore is an area in Cape Town, South Africa, situated between the historic city centre and the modern Port of Cape Town. It is built on land reclaimed from Table Bay in the 1930s and 1940s in connection with the construction of the Duncan Dock to replace the old harbour. Much of the Foreshore area is occupied by transport infrastructure for the port and Cape Town Railway Station. Other notable buildings in the area are the Cape Town Civic Centre, the Artscape Theatre Centre, and the Cape Town International Convention Centre. When the area was reclaimed, the Government undertook a detailed study (the Szlumper Commission) to decide how to use the land not needed by South African Railways. This resulted in the issuance of a detailed proposal, The Cape Town Foreshore Plan.

External links

The Cape Town Foreshore Plan 1947

References

Geography of Cape Town
Land reclamation